China Postal Airlines (T: 中國郵政航空, P: Zhōngguó Yóuzhèng Hángkōng) is a cargo airline based on the 11th through 14th floors of the Ziyu Office Building (S: 紫玉写字楼, T: 紫玉	
寫字樓, P: Zǐyù Xiězìlóu) in Haidian District, Beijing, People's Republic of China. Its main base is Nanjing Lukou International Airport.

History 
The airline was established on 25 November 1996 and started to operate on 27 February 1997. It is owned by Chinese Postal Bureau (51%) and China Southern Airlines (49%). It was originally set up to operate domestic postal services, but in 2006 introduced international scheduled services to South Korea and Japan. From January 2007 international cargo charter services were introduced.

In December 2015 it was announced that a total of 7 used Boeing 757 and 10 used Boeing 737 would be acquired from Boeing, being converted to freighters via Boeing's Converted Freighter (BCF) program, to be delivered in 2016 and 2017 to expand the existing fleet.

Destinations 
China Postal Airlines operates express mail and cargo transport services mainly for China Post to over 300 domestic destinations, as well as international scheduled and charter services.

Fleet

Current fleet

, China Postal Airlines fleet consists of the following aircraft:

Former fleet
The airline previously operated the following aircraft (as of August 2018):
 1 further Boeing 737-300F
 2 further Boeing 757-200PCF in storage.

See also
China Post
China Southern Airlines

References

External links 

 China Postal Airlines

Cargo airlines of China
Airlines established in 1996
Companies based in Beijing
China Post
China Southern Airlines
Joint ventures